Chŏng Chŏl is a crater on Mercury. It has a diameter of 143 kilometers. Its name was adopted by the International Astronomical Union (IAU) in 1979. Chŏng Chŏl is named for the Korean poet Jeong Cheol, who lived from 1536 to 1593.

Chŏng Chŏl lies at the north margin of Sobkou Planitia.  To the north is Burns crater, to the northeast are To Ngoc Van and Bruegel, and to the southeast is Whitman.

References

Impact craters on Mercury